Zolsky (masculine), Zolskaya (feminine), or Zolskoye (neuter) is the name of several rural localities in Russia:
Zolskoye, a selo in Zolsky District of the Kabardino-Balkar Republic
Zolskaya, a stanitsa in Zolsky Selsoviet of Kirovsky District of Stavropol Krai